Mangelia kowiensis is a species of sea snail, a marine gastropod mollusk in the family Mangeliidae.

Description
The length of the shell attains 3.3 mm, its diameter 1.5 mm.

Distribution
This marine species occurs off Port Alfred, South Africa.

References

 Turton, William Harry. The marine shells of Port Alfred, S. Africa. H. Milford, Oxford University Press, 1932. p. 25 pl. 5 # 190

External links
  Tucker, J.K. 2004 Catalog of recent and fossil turrids (Mollusca: Gastropoda). Zootaxa 682:1–1295.
 

Endemic fauna of South Africa
kowiensis
Gastropods described in 1932